Anant Damodar Raje (17 September 1929 – 27 June 2009) was an Indian architect and academic.

Early life
Anant Raje was born in Mumbai, India. He graduated from the Sir J. J. College of Architecture in 1954.

Career
He worked with Louis Kahn in Philadelphia, where he also taught at the University of Pennsylvania. As Kahn's student, he devoted his life to see the completion of the Indian Institute of Management, Ahmedabad, which Kahn did not live to see completed.

For over thirty years he has taught at the Faculty of Architecture, CEPT University, Ahmedabad. He also taught at the University of New Mexico, in The United States of America, and was a visiting professor at many universities in America and Europe.

Major buildings
 Executive Management Centre at the Indian Institute of Management in Ahmedabad, India
 Indian Institute of Forest Management, Bhopal, India
 The Indian Statistical Institute in New Delhi.
 Museum Of Minerals, Nagpur (unbuilt)
 Galbabhai Farmers' Training Institute in Banaskantha, Gujarat
MAFCO wholesale market, Mumbai, India
Abc

Death
Raje died on 27 June 2009.

References

External links
Texts and Projects by Anant Raje on Architexturez South Asia

1929 births
2009 deaths
Academic staff of CEPT University
20th-century Indian architects